Tres Cruces Airport  is one of numerous rural airstrips in the agricultural area east of Santa Cruz de la Sierra, a city in the Santa Cruz Department of Bolivia.

See also

Transport in Bolivia
List of airports in Bolivia

References

External links 
OpenStreetMap - Tres Cruces Airport
OurAirports - Tres Cruces
FallingRain - Tres Cruces Airport

Airports in Santa Cruz Department (Bolivia)